Conching is a process used in the manufacture of chocolate whereby a surface scraping mixer and agitator, known as a conche, evenly distributes cocoa butter within chocolate and may act as a "polisher" of the particles. It also promotes flavor development through frictional heat, release of volatiles and acids, and oxidation. The name arises from the shape of the vessels initially used which resembled conch shells.

When ingredients are mixed in this way, sometimes for up to 78 hours, chocolate can be produced with a mild, rich taste. Lower-quality chocolate is conched for as little as 6 hours. Since the process is so important to the final texture and flavor of chocolate, manufacturers keep the details of their conching process proprietary.

There are numerous designs of conches. Food scientists are still studying precisely what happens during conching and why.

History 

Rodolphe Lindt invented the conche in Berne, Switzerland, in 1879. It produced chocolate with superior aroma and melting characteristics compared to other processes used at that time. The Lindt chocolate company states that Lindt (perhaps mistakenly) allowed a mixer containing chocolate to run over a weekend (or possibly overnight, according to other variants of the possibly apocryphal story). Upon returning to the device, Lindt recognised the final product to have different properties to conventionally produced chocolate at the time, with a less granular texture and greater shine than conventional chocolate at the time, which was generally gritty when solidified owing to the presence of non-ideal cocoa butter crystals. Lindt's invention made the mass-production of chocolate bars more practical, eventually replacing chocolate beverages as the primary means of mass chocolate consumption.

Lindt's original conche consisted of a granite roller and granite trough; such a configuration is now called a "long conche" and can take more than a day to process a tonne of chocolate. The ends of the trough were shaped to allow the chocolate to be thrown back over the roller at the end of each stroke, increasing the surface area exposed to air. A modern rotary conche can process 3 to 10 tonnes of chocolate in less than 12 hours. Modern conches have cooled jacketed vessels containing long mixer shafts with radial arms that press the chocolate against vessel sides. A single machine can carry out all the steps of grinding, mixing, and conching required for small batches of chocolate.

Process 

Conching redistributes the substances from the dry cocoa that create flavor into the fat phase. Air flowing through the conche removes some unwanted acetic, propionic, and butyric acids from the chocolate and reduces moisture. Even a small amount of moisture greatly increases the viscosity of the finished chocolate, so machinery is cleaned with cocoa butter instead of water. Some of the substances produced in the roasting of cocoa beans are oxidized in the conche, mellowing the flavor of the product.

The temperature of the conche is controlled and varies for different types of chocolate. Generally, higher temperature leads to a shorter required processing time. The elevated temperature leads to a partially caramelized flavor and in milk chocolate promotes the Maillard reaction.

The chocolate passes through three phases during conching. In the dry phase the material is in powdery form, and the mixing coats the particles with fat. Air movement through the conche removes some moisture and volatile substances, which may give an acidic note to the flavor. Moisture balance affects the flavor and texture of the finished product because, after the particles are coated with fat, moisture and volatile chemicals are less likely to escape.

In the pasty phase more of the particles are coated with the fats from the cocoa. The power required to turn the conche shafts increases at this step.

The final liquid phase allows minor adjustment to the viscosity of the finished product by addition of fats and emulsifiers, depending on the intended use of the chocolate.

While most conches are batch-process machines, continuous-flow conches separate the stages with weirs, over which the product travels through separate parts of the machine. A continuous conche can reduce the conching time for milk chocolate to as little as four hours.

See also 
 Melanger
 History of chocolate

References

External links 
 Conching - ScienceDirect
 Refining and Conching - Grenada Chocolate
 Manufacturer's illustration of production-size conche and mixing shaft

Chocolate
Cooking techniques
Articles containing video clips